Luis de Cañizares, O.M. (1580 – 4 July 1645) was a Roman Catholic prelate who served as Bishop of Comayagua (1629–1645) and Bishop of Nueva Caceres (1624–1628).

Biography
Luis de Cañizares was born in Madrid, Spain in 1580 and ordained a priest in the Order of the Minims on 20 January 1599. On 1 July 1624, he was appointed during the papacy of Pope Urban VIII as Bishop of Nueva Caceres. In 1624, he was consecrated bishop by Juan Pérez de la Serna, Archbishop of México. On 19 June 1628, he was appointed during the papacy of Pope Urban VIII as Coadjutator Bishop of Comayagua and succeeded to the bishopric in 1629. He served as Bishop of Comayagua until his death on 4 July 1645 . While bishop, he was the principal consecrator of Fernando Núñez Sagredo, Bishop of Nicaragua (1633).

References

External links and additional sources
 (for Chronology of Bishops) 
 (for Chronology of Bishops) 
 (for Chronology of Bishops) 
 (for Chronology of Bishops) 

17th-century Roman Catholic bishops in the Philippines
Bishops appointed by Pope Urban VIII
Clergy from Madrid
1580 births
1645 deaths
Minims (religious order)
17th-century Roman Catholic bishops in Honduras
Roman Catholic bishops of Cáceres
Roman Catholic bishops of Comayagua